is a passenger railway station in the city of Kasama, Ibaraki, Japan, operated by East Japan Railway Company (JR East).

Lines
Fukuhara Station is served by the Mito Line and is located 37.0 km from the official starting point of the line at Oyama Station.

Station layout
The station consists of one side platform (platform 1) and one island platform (platforms 2 and 3) serving three tracks. The platforms are connected by a footbridge. The former wooden station building was rebuilt between October 2012 and spring 2013.

Platforms

History
The station opened on 1 December 1890. The station was absorbed into the JR East network upon the privatization of the Japanese National Railways (JNR) on 1 April 1987.

Passenger statistics
In fiscal year 2019, an average of 148 passengers boarded trains at the station daily.

The passenger figures for previous years are as shown below.

Surrounding area
 
Fukuhara Post Office
Fukuhara station is a terminus of the Wagakuni to Atago mountain hiking train, whose other terminus is Iwama station.

See also
 List of railway stations in Japan

References

External links

 Fukuhara Station information (JR East) 

Railway stations in Ibaraki Prefecture
Mito Line
Railway stations in Japan opened in 1890
Kasama, Ibaraki